Dream Deceiver is the second album by Dutch thrash metal band Dead Head, released in 1993. It was the follow-up to The Feast Begins at Dawn, and features slower tempos, melodic guitar harmonies, and more death metal influence than the debut. Dream Deceiver was produced by Gert Stegeman at Westerhuis Audio. It is the only album by Dead Head not to feature Hans Spijker on drums, instead featuring Marco Kleinnibbelink.

Track listing

Personnel
Tom van Dijk – bass, vocals
Robbie Woning – guitar
Ronnie van der Wey – guitar
Marco Kleinnibbelink – drums

References

Dead Head albums
1993 albums